Adriana Pamela Venegas Morales (born 12 June 1989) is a Costa Rican footballer who plays as a forward. She represented Costa Rica at the 2015 FIFA Women's World Cup.

Personal life
Adriana's sister Carolina was also a forward in the Costa Rican team at the 2015 FIFA Women's World Cup. Adriana was the only mother in the squad, her daughter is named Isabella.

References

External links
 
 Profile  at Fedefutbol
 

1989 births
Living people
Costa Rican women's footballers
Costa Rica women's international footballers
2015 FIFA Women's World Cup players
Women's association football forwards